Yemen TV is the public national television station in Yemen. Established in 1975, the channel was the first official channel to broadcast as local media in what was the Yemen Arab Republic, also commonly known as North Yemen. The station is based in Sana'a and started broadcasting on 24 September 1975.

After unification of the country with Aden popularly known as South Yemen to form the present day Republic of Yemen, the channel continued to enjoy the title of the national broadcaster of the new united Yemen.

Yemen TV, alongside many other Arab television channels joined INTELSAT-59 in 1995 where it started broadcasting on satellite starting 20 December 1995. It later expanded broadcasting onto Arabsat (2A). A second channel was added in 2000.

On 19 January 2015, the Houthis seized the channel.
The channel then split into two factions: one pro-government (loyal to Abdrabbuh Mansur Hadi), the other pro-Houthi. On 21 January, the director of the channel resigned.

The station's director of the pro-Houthis faction was killed, along with his entire family, on 9 February 2016 by an air strike of the Saudi-led coalition during the latter's intervention in Yemen.

On 19 February 2016, a cameraman of the Hadi faction was killed in Ta'izz.

See also
Television in Yemen

References

External links 
 Official website close to Cabinet of Yemen

Arab mass media
Television in Yemen
Television stations in Yemen
Television channels and stations established in 1975